Delaware was reduced once more from two back to one seat after the Fourth Census, which number has remained constant to the present day. At the time of the 1822 election, the second seat in Delaware's at-large district was vacant, so there was only one incumbent going into the election.

See also 
 1822 Delaware's at-large congressional district special election
 1822 and 1823 United States House of Representatives elections
 List of United States representatives from Delaware

1822
Delaware
United States House of Representatives